"Believe" is the second single from English electronic music duo the Chemical Brothers' fifth studio album, Push the Button (2005). The single was released on 2 May 2005 and peaked at number 18 on the UK Singles Chart while reaching the top 20 in Italy and Spain. Kele Okereke, lead singer and rhythm guitarist of the indie rock band Bloc Party is featured on vocals. A remix of the song was featured in the 2005 snowboarding video "Flavor Country" by Sandbox.

Composition
John Bush from AllMusic described: "[The song] agonizing over an energized electroshock production composed of equal parts Prince and Chicago acid house."

Critical reception
While reviewing Push the Button, Robert Christgau called the song along with "The Big Jump", "rock the block." Thump, "an electronic music and culture channel" from Vice, listed the song as one of the duo's 15 best collaborations, ranked at number 12. Rolling Stones Bill Werde wrote that "the urgent yelp of Kele Okereke from Bloc Party makes 'Believe' a club-anthem-in-waiting."

Music video
The video was premiered on MTV on 18 March 2005. The music video for the song was directed by Dom and Nic, contains scenes filmed at the now defunct MG Rover Longbridge plant (now owned by SAIC) and different parts of London. It starts out with a man watching women in an exercise video dance on a window TV in a store, possibly spoofing the then-recent video for Eric Prydz's single "Call on Me". The man turns out to be a paranoid factory worker terrified of the automated assembly robot he operates, possibly under the influence of hallucinogenic drugs or possibly painkillers, as he has a cast on his left arm.

He imagines the machines watching and threatening him, seeing them outside the factory, chasing him before disappearing. Finally, even after quitting his job, the man is pursued to the top of the building by one of the arms, where it lunges at him before disappearing. He runs onto the street, and sees multiple machines lumbering toward him, and his view of the world (in actuality the Welbeck Street car park) disintegrates into a mess of geometric shapes and colours. He collapses, laughing hysterically as robots disappear once again.

The video won a MTV Europe Music Award for Best Video at its 2005 MTV Europe Music Awards.

Track listings

UK CD1 and European CD single
 "Believe"  – 3:48
 "Giant" – 4:32

UK CD2
 "Believe"  – 6:20
 "Spring" – 5:27
 "Believe"  – 6:23
 "Believe"  – 4:22

UK 12-inch single
A1. "Believe" 
B1. "Galvanize" 
B2. "Giant"

Australian CD single
 "Believe" 
 "Spring"
 "Believe"

Charts

Release history

References

The Chemical Brothers songs
2005 singles
2005 songs
Astralwerks singles
Songs written by Ed Simons
Songs written by Kele Okereke
Songs written by Tom Rowlands
Virgin Records singles